Selkirk was a small sternwheel steamer that operated on the Thompson and Columbia rivers in British Columbia from 1895 to 1917.  This vessel should not be confused with the much larger Yukon River sternwheeler Selkirk.

Design and construction
Selkirk was built by Alexander Watson, an experienced shipbuilder from Victoria, BC at Kamloops, BC for Harold E. Forster, a wealthy man who wanted a steamboat for private excursions in the Kamloops area.  The vessel was described as top-heavy.

Operations on the Thompson River

Forster operated Selkirk on the Thompson River until June 29, 1898, when 25 miles above Kamloops, Selkirk turned into an eddy and capsized.  A number of passengers, including some children, were trapped and nearly drowned, but were rescued before the vessel sank.  Three months later Forster was able to raise Selkirk.  While he was floating the vessel downstream to Kamloops for repair, the boat capsized again, and this time the deckhouse was washed away.  Eventually Forster was able to return to Kamloops with the wreck of the steamer.

Transfer to the Columbia River

Forster did nothing with the vessel until the spring of 1899, when he had Selkirk loaded onto two flatcars and shipped by rail to Golden, BC on the uppermost reaches of the Columbia River where the vessel was reconstructed.  Forster did not however immediately place the vessel in commercial service.  In 1906 gasoline engines were installed in place of the original steam engines.  In 1913 Selkirk was sold to Capt. E.N. Russell.

Withdrawal from service
Selkirk was withdrawn from the vessel register in 1917.  The vessel was hauled out on the ways at Golden, where she was apparently simply abandoned.

Notes

Further reading

 Faber, Jim, Steamer's Wake—Voyaging down the old marine highways of Puget Sound, British Columbia, and the Columbia River, Enetai Press, Seattle, WA 1985 
 Timmen, Fritz, Blow for the Landing, 75-78, 134, Caxton Printers, Caldwell, ID 1972 

Paddle steamers of British Columbia
Steamboats of the Columbia River
Columbia Valley
1895 ships